Palmtree is a rural locality in the Toowoomba Region, Queensland, Australia. In the  Palmtree had a population of 73 people.

History 
The locality takes its name from  State School name first used 1901, for the settlement at the terminus of the Hampton Timber Tramway to the head of Perseverance Creek. The sawmill and tramway closed in 1936.

Palm Tree Provisonal School opened in 1901. On 1 January 1909 it became Palm Tree State School. It closed in 1960.

In the  Palmtree had a population of 73 people.

See also
 List of tramways in Queensland

References 

Toowoomba Region
Localities in Queensland